The Yorkshire Arts Association (YAA) was a registered charity founded in 1970, with the goal of fostering the arts in the English county of Yorkshire. It was merged into Yorkshire and Humberside Arts in 1991. The association was known for funding film and video productions, funding 48 films from 1970 to 1986. Its headquarters was in Bradford, West Yorkshire.

The performance art group COUM Transmissions, a precursor of the band Throbbing Gristle, were granted a small Experimental Arts Grant by the YAA.

See also 
 New Yorkshire Writing

References 

Arts councils of the United Kingdom
Arts organisations based in England
Arts organizations established in 1970
Arts organizations disestablished in 1991
1970 establishments in England
1991 disestablishments in England